Ian Rognvald Morrice is a Scottish-born CEO of Australia's largest wholesaler, Metcash Limited. He was appointed Group CEO in July 2013. Metcash is the leading buying, marketing and distribution company to independent retailers across Australia, a company that provides grocery goods, liquor and hardware to retailers. However, Ian Morrice had also held a non-executive director position with Metcash since June 2012.

Ian Morrice has a master of business administration degree from Cranfield University in Bedfordshire, England.

Morrice served as the group chief executive officer for The Warehouse Limited (NZ) from 1 August 2004 until May 2011. Prior to 2004, Morrice had served as the managing director of B&Q Warehouse, a division of Kingfisher plc, a large-format warehouse chain company based in the United Kingdom. Starting with B&Q in 2001, Morrice had led the company to its successful expansion into Ireland and the company's launch for providing financial services.

Morrice has extensive experience in retail; for years he was the retail director for Woolworths chain of over 800 stores throughout the United Kingdom. He has served in multiple positions as a senior executive for Dixon's, currently the number one electrical retail group in Europe. From August 2012 to 1 March 2013, Morrice was a non-executive director for Myer, an Australian retailer that operates a chain of department stores that sell men's, women's, and children's apparel among other products for the home. From 9 September 2004 to 2 May 2011, Morrice served as an executive director for The Warehouse Group Limited and for The Warehouse Stationary Limited.

References

New Zealand businesspeople
Living people
Scottish emigrants to New Zealand
Place of birth missing (living people)
Year of birth missing (living people)